Randy Jerry Ramsey (born September 7, 1995) is an American football outside linebacker who is a free agent. He played college football at Arkansas.

College career
Ramsey played in 39 games for Arkansas registering 90 tackles, 16 tackles for loss and forcing four fumbles, recovering two.

Professional career
After going undrafted in the 2019 NFL Draft, Ramsey signed with the Green Bay Packers on May 3, 2019. The Packers released Ramsey on August 31 and re-signed him to their practice squad on September 1. Ramsey spent the entire 2019 season on the Packers' practice squad, and was re-signed by the Packers on January 21, 2020. Ramsey made the 53-man roster for the 2020 season, but missed the first three games with a groin injury. He made his NFL debut on October 5, 2020 during a Week 4 victory over the Atlanta Falcons. He signed an exclusive-rights free agent tender on March 18, 2021, to remain with the Packers. He was placed on injured reserve on August 12, 2021. He signed his tender offer from the Packers on April 18, 2022, to keep him with the team. He was released on August 16, 2022.

NFL career statistics

Regular season

References

External links
Arkansas Razorbacks bio
Green Bay Packers bio

Green Bay Packers players
1995 births
Living people
Arkansas Razorbacks football players
American football linebackers